PGA1 may refer to : 
 Micro-PGA1, the predecessor of the Intel's Micro-PGA2 pin grid array package for their Pentium III
 Prostaglandin A1, a form of prostaglandin